Bruyère is a French name (the word bruyère means heather in French or a place where heather grows, brugière derives from it).

The family name Bruyère may refer to: 
 Bernard Bruyère (1879–1971), French Egyptologist
 Élisabeth Bruyère or Bruguier (1818–1876), the Canadian founder of the Sisters of Charity of Bytown
 Francesco Bruyere (1980), an Italian judoka
 Jean de La Bruyère (1645–1696),  French essayist and moralist, also known for his writing skills shown in his "The Characters, or the Manners of the Age, with The Characters of Theophrastus"
 Jean Pierre Joseph Bruyère or Bruguière (1772–1813), French cavalry general of the Napoleonic Wars
 Joseph Bruyère (1948), a former Belgian cyclist
 Marie-Louise Bruyère, aka Madame Bruyère, a French fashion designer who worked from 1928 until the 1950s
 Véronique Bruyère, Belgian computer scientist

See also
 Bruyères
 La Bruyère (disambiguation)
 Bruguière
 Brugère

French-language surnames